Roxburgh Park railway station is located on the Craigieburn line in Victoria, Australia. It serves the northern Melbourne suburb of Roxburgh Park, and opened on 21 September 2007.

It was built just north of the site of the former Somerton station, which was closed to passengers in 1960. However, the adjacent goods yard and standard gauge crossing loop retain the Somerton name.

Roxburgh Park station was provided as part of the extension of electrified services from Broadmeadows to Craigieburn. The Craigieburn-bound (down) line was slewed to the west, to permit an island platform to be built between the two tracks of the broad gauge main line.

History
Somerton opened to traffic as a single platform on 15 May 1881. In 1889, Somerton became a junction, when what is now the Upfield line was opened from North Melbourne northwards through Coburg. That line was closed to traffic from the Somerton end in 1903. The line through Coburg, then terminating at Fawkner, was reopened in 1928, but no junction was provided at Somerton. Instead, the AEC railmotor that operated the service was turned using a turntable to the south of the station. This situation remained until 1956, when the line from Fawkner was again closed.

In 1959, the line from Somerton to Upfield was reopened for freight traffic, to serve the Ford Motor Company factory, with suburban services extended to Upfield from the city side. On 6 December 1960, Somerton was closed to passengers, but additional freight sidings were provided in the Somerton area throughout the 1960s.

Construction of the Melbourne - Sydney standard gauge line also commenced at that time, opening for traffic in 1962, and the freight line from Somerton to Upfield was converted to dual gauge in 1963. In 1988, a dual-gauge siding was provided to nearby cement silos and, in 1998, Austrak commenced development of a container terminal, as part of a larger "freight village". A number of major companies entered into long-term tenancies for warehouses at the site and, in 2004, Austrak entered into a lease with P&O Trans Australia to operate the terminal. The Somerton terminal has four 750-metre dual-gauge rail sidings, with connections northwards on both gauges. In 2000, the crossing loop on the standard gauge line was extended at the down end.

Today, the area to the east of the main line contains a complicated arrangement of broad, standard, and dual-gauge tracks.

Roxburgh Park officially opened on 21 September 2007, but services to and from the station did not commence until 30 September of that year. The station was opened by the then Victorian Premier John Brumby, the then Minister for Public Transport Lynne Kosky, and the then MLA for Yuroke, Liz Beattie.

On 4 May 2010, a collision between a Comeng train set and a quarry train going to Kilmore East, led by Pacific National locomotive G524, occurred between Roxburgh Park and Craigieburn.

Platforms and services
Roxburgh Park has one island platform with two faces. It is served by Craigieburn line trains.

Platform 1:
  all stations services to Flinders Street

Platform 2:
  all stations services to Craigieburn

Transport links
CDC Melbourne operates two bus routes to and from Roxburgh Park station, under contract to Public Transport Victoria:
 : to Broadmeadows station
 : to Greenvale Gardens

Dysons operates two bus routes via Roxburgh Park station, under contract to Public Transport Victoria:
 : Broadmeadows station – Craigieburn North
 : to Pascoe Vale station

Kastoria Bus Lines operates one route to and from Roxburgh Park station, under contract to Public Transport Victoria:
 : to Craigieburn station

Kinetic Melbourne operates one SmartBus route via Roxburgh Park station, under contract to Public Transport Victoria:
  : Frankston station – Melbourne Airport

Gallery

References

External links

 Melway map at street-directory.com.au

Railway stations in Melbourne
Railway stations in Australia opened in 2007
Railway stations in the City of Hume